Following is a list of rulers of Malwa since the Janpada Kingdoms:

Malava dynasty (c.  1200 – 840 BCE) 
 King Aswapati and his queen was Malavi (Malwa named after Malavi), their descendants dynasty first ruled Malwa.

Dhanna Bhil dynasty (c. 840 – 400 BCE)
 King Dhanna and his descendants dynasty ruled Malwa before feudatories to Malavas until 400s BCE.

Malwa under Magadha dynasties

Haryanka dynasty (c. 544 – 413 BCE) 

Rulers-

Shishunaga dynasty (c. 413 – 345 BCE) 

Rulers-

Nanda Empire (c. 345 – 322 BCE) 

Rulers-

Maurya Empire (c. 322 – 185 BCE) 

Rulers-

Shunga Empire (c. 185 – 73 BCE) 

Rulers-

Malwa under Andhra-Satavahana Empire (c. 100 BCE – 200 CE) 

Himanshu Prabha Ray provides the following chronology, based on archaeological and numismatic evidence:
 Simuka (before 100 BCE)
 Kanha (100–70 BCE)
 Satakarni I (70–60 BCE)
 Satakarni II (50–25 BCE)
 Kshatrapa interregnum with vassal Satavahana kings like Hāla
 Nahapana (54-100 CE)
 Gautamiputra Satakarni (86–110 CE)
 Pulumavi (110–138 CE)
 Vashishtiputra Satakarni (138–145 CE)
 Shiva Shri Pulumavi (145–152 CE)
 Shiva Skanda Satakarni (145–152 CE)
 Yajna Shri Satakarni (152–181 CE)
 Vijaya Satakarni (until 200s CE)

Malwa under Kushan Empire (c. 1 – 375 CE)

Western Saka dynasty (c. 119 – 395 CE) 

 Nahapana (119–124)
 Chastana (124)
 Jayadaman (124–130)
 Rudradaman I (130–170)
 Damajadasri I (170–175)
 Jivadaman (175–199)
 Rudrasimha I (175–188)
Abhira interregnum-
 Isvaradatta (188–191) 
Restored Satraps-
 Rudrasimha I (restored) (191–197)
 Jivadaman (197–199)
 Rudrasena I (200–222)
 Samghadaman (222–223)
 Damasena (223–232)
 Damajadasri II (232–239)
 Viradaman (234–238)
 Yasodaman I (239)
 Vijayasena (239–250)
 Damajadasri III (251–255)
 Rudrasena II (255–277)
 Visvasimha (277–282)
 Bhratadarman (282–295) 
 Visvasena (293–304)
 Rudrasimha II (304–317)
 Yasodaman II (317–332)
 Rudradaman II (332–348)
 Rudrasena III (348–380)
 Simhasena (380–382)
 Rudrasena IV (382–388)
 Rudrasimha III (388–395)

Bharshiva dynasty (Nagas of Padmavati) (c. 175 – 325 CE) 

Vrisha-naga
(Possibly ruled at Vidisha in the late 2nd Century).
Vrishabha or Vrisha-bhava
(May also be the name of a distinct king who succeeded Vrisha-naga).
Bhima-naga (210–230 CE)
(Probably the first king to rule from Padmavati)
Skanda-naga
Vasu-naga
Brihaspati-naga
Vibhu-naga
Ravi-naga
Bhava-naga
Prabhakara-naga
Deva-naga
Vyaghra-naga
Ganapati-naga

Malwa under Gupta Empire (c. 335 – 550 CE) 

List of complete Gupt rulers-

Aulikara Empire of Dashapura (c. 300 – 560 CE) 

Rulers of First Aulikara dynasty-
 Jayavarma
 Simhavarma
 Naravarma
 Vishvavarma
 Bandhuvarma

Rulers of Second Aulikara dynasty-
 Drumavardhana 
 Jayavardhana
 Ajitavardhana
 Vibhishanavardhana
 Rajyavardhana
 Prakashadharma
 Yashodharman (c. 515–545 CE)

Harsha Empire (c. 606–647 CE)

 Harshavardhana (606–647), unified Northern India and ruled it for over 40 years, he was the last non-Muslim emperor to rule a unified Northern India.

Pratihara Empire (c. 725 – 1036 CE) 

Nagabhata I (725–756), last ruler
Kakustha (756–765)
Devaraja (765–778)
Vatsaraja (778–805)
Nagabhata II (800–833)
Ramabhadra (833–836)
Mihira Bhoja (836–890), greatest ruler
Mahendrapala I (890–910)
Bhoja II (910–913)
Mahipala I (913–944)
Mahendrapala II (944–948)
Devpala (948–954)
Vinaykpala (954–955)
Mahipala II (955–956)
Vijaypala II (956–960)
Rajapala (960–1018)
Trilochanpala (1018–1027)
Jasapala (Yashpala) (1024–1036), last  ruler

Paramara dynasty of Malwa (c. 800 – 1305 CE) 

According to historical Kailash Chand Jain, "Knowledge of the early Paramara rulers from Upendra to Vairisimha is scanty; there are no records, and they are known only from later sources."

The Paramara rulers mentioned in the various inscriptions and literary sources include:

 Paramara (early ruler)
 Upendra Krishnraja (late 8 to early 9th century CE)
 Vairisimha (I) (early 9th century CE)
 Siyaka (I) (mid of 9th century CE)
 Vakpati (I) (late 9th or early 10th century CE)
 Vairisimha (II) (middle 10th century CE)
 Siyaka (II) (940–972 CE)
 Vakpati (II) alias Munja (972–990 CE)
 Sindhuraja (990–1010 CE)
 Bhoja (1010–1055 CE), greatest ruler of dynasty
 Jayasimha I (1055–1070 CE)
 Udayaditya (1070–1086 CE)
 Lakshmadeva (1086–1094 CE)
 Naravarman (1094–1130 CE)
 Yashovarman (1133–1142 CE)
 Jayavarman I (1142–1143 CE)
 Interregnum from (1143 to 1175 CE) under an usurper named 'Ballala' and later the Solanki king Kumarapala
 Vindhyavarman (1175–1194 CE)
 Subhatavarman (1194–1209 CE)
 Arjunavarman I (1210–1215 CE)
 Devapala (1218–1239 CE)
 Jaitugideva (1239–1255 CE)
 Jayavarman II (1255–1274 CE)
 Arjunavarman II (1274–1285 CE)
 Bhoja II (1285–1303 CE)
 Mahalakadeva (1303–1305 CE), (after his death dynasty was ended in Malwa region)

Malwa Sultanate rule

Ghorids

 Dilawar Khan (1390–1405)
 Alp Khan Hushang (1405–1435)
 Mahmud Khalji (1435–1436)

Khiljis
 Mahmud Shah I (1436–1469)
 Ghiyath Shah (1469–1500)
 Nasr Shah (1500–1511)
 Muhamud Shah II (1511–1531)

Qadirid
 Qadir Shah (1535–1542)

Shuja'at Khani 

 Miyan Bayezid Baz Bahadur (1555–1562)

Mughal rule

 Mughals ruled Malwa from (1562–1720 CE)

Malwa under Maratha Empire (c. 1713 – 1948 CE) 

Territory under Maratha control in 1760 (yellow)

Peshwas region (c. 1713 – 1858 CE) 

Technically they were not monarchs, but hereditary prime ministers, though in fact they ruled instead of the Chhatrapati (Maratha emperor) after death of Chattrapati Shahu, and were hegemon of the Maratha confederation.

 Balaji Vishwanath (1713–2 April 1720) (b. 1660, died 2 April 1720)
 Peshwa Bajirao I (17 April 1720 – 28 April 1740) (b. 18 August 1700, died 28 April 1740)
 Balaji Bajirao (4 July 1740 – 23 June 1761) (b. 8 December 1721, d. 23 June 1761)
 Madhavrao Ballal (1761–18 November 1772) (b. 16 February 1745, d. 18 November 1772)
 Narayanrao Bajirao (13 Dec 1772–30 August 1773) (b. 10 August 1755, d. 30 August 1773)
 Raghunath Rao Bajirao (5 Dec 1773–1774) (b. 18 August 1734, d. 11 December 1783)
 Sawai Madhavrao (1774–27 October 1795) (b. 18 April 1774, d. 27 October 1795)
 Baji Rao II (6 Dec 1796–3 June 1818) (d. 28 January 1851)
 Nana Sahib (1 July 1857 – 1858) (b. 19 May 1825, d. 24 September 1859)

Dhar State (c. 1730 – 1947 CE)

Holkar rulers of Indore (c. 1731 – 1948 CE) 

 Malharrao Holkar (I) (r. 2 November 1731 – 19 May 1766)
 Malharrao Khanderao Holkar (r. 23 August 1766 – 5 April 1767)

Ahilyadevi Holkar (r. 5 April 1767 – 13 August 1795)
 Tukojirao Holkar (I) (r. 13 August 1795 – 29 January 1797)
 Kashirao Tukojirao Holkar (r. 29 January 1797 – 1798)
 Yashwantrao Holkar (I) (r. 1798–27 November 1811)
 Malharrao Yashwantrao Holkar II (r. November 1811–27 October 1833)
 Martandrao Malharrao Holkar (r. 17 January 1834 – 2 February 1834)
 Harirao Vitthojirao Holkar (r. 17 April 1834 – 24 October 1843)
 Khanderao Harirao Holkar II (r. 13 November 1843 – 17 February 1844)
 Tukojirao Gandharebhau Holkar II (r. 27 June 1844 – 17 June 1886)
 Shivajirao Tukojirao Holkar (r. 17 June 1886 – 31 January 1903)
 Tukojirao Shivajirao Holkar III (r. 31 January 1903 – 26 February 1926)
 Yashwantrao Holkar II (r. 26 February 1926 – 1961)

British Colonial rule

 British ruled Malwa from (1858–1948 CE)

See also 
 Malwa
 Malavas
 Malwa culture
 History of India
 List of Indian monarchs
 History of Madhya Pradesh

References

 
Malwa